Borj is a village in Astaneh Rural District, in the Central District of Shazand County, Markazi Province, Iran. At the 2006 census, its population was 203, in 50 families.

References 

Populated places in Shazand County